The footballfish form a family, Himantolophidae, of globose, deep-sea anglerfishes found in tropical and subtropical waters of the Atlantic, Indian, and Pacific Ocean. The family contains about 22 species all in a single genus, Himantolophus (from the Greek imantos, "thong, strap", and lophos, "crest").

Description
Their flesh is gelatinous, but thickens in the larger females, which also possess a covering of "bucklers" — round, bony plates each with a median spine — that are absent in males. Both are a reddish brown to black in life.

In females, the mouth is large and oblique. The subequal jaws are anteriorly lined with rows of numerous close-set, depressible, and retrorse teeth; vomerine teeth are absent. Footballfish females differ from those of other ceratioid families by their shortened, blunt snout; along with the chin, it is covered in sensory papillae. Originating above or slightly in advance of the small eye is an illicium (the "fishing rod") and at its end a bioluminescent, bulbous esca (the "fishing lure", its light owing to symbiotic bacteria). Escal morphology varies between species, and it may or may not possess denticles or accessory appendages, the latter either branched or unbranched. The pterygiophore of the illicium does not protrude from the snout, and there is no hyoid barbel.

At maturity, the streamlined males have an enlarged posterior nostril (with 10–17 lamellae); slightly ovoid eye with an enlarged pupil creating a narrow anterior aphakic space; no ilicium or esca; and the head and body is covered in dermal spinules, those along the snout midline being enlarged. The jaw lacks teeth, whereas those of the denticular bone have fused into a larger mass; the upper denticular bone possesses 10–17 hooked denticles.

In both sexes, the fins are spineless: the single dorsal fin with 5–6 soft rays, the pectoral fins with 14–18, the anal fin with four, and the caudal fin with 19. There are six branchiostegal rays and 19 vertebrae; the parietal is lacking throughout life, there are no epurals, and the pelvic bone is triradiate.

Life history
The footballfish was first discovered in 1837 by Johan Reinhardt. Their poor musculature and cumbersome morphology indicate that mature female footballfish are probably poor swimmers and largely sedentary, lie-in-wait predators. They are primarily mesopelagic, living in open water, with very few caught below . Females are carnivorous and feed upon other pelagic fish (such as lanternfishes and ridgeheads) and cephalopods, as well as shrimp and euphausiids that are presumably attracted to within striking distance by the footballfish's luminous lure.

Himantolophidae are one of the families of angler fish that do NOT use sexual parasitism.

Footballfish are presumed to be non-guarders that spawn pelagically. Their larvae are epipelagic (occurring in the well-lit 200 m of the water column), indicating they probably undergo an ontogenetic descent into deeper waters as the larvae mature. Predators of footballfish include sperm whales and other footballfish.

Species
There are currently 22 recognized species in this genus:
 Himantolophus albinares Maul, 1961
 Himantolophus appelii F. E. Clarke, 1878 (Prickly anglerfish)
 Himantolophus azurlucens Beebe & Crane, 1947
 Himantolophus borealis Kharin, 1984
 Himantolophus brevirostris Regan, 1925
 Himantolophus compressus Osório, 1912
 Himantolophus cornifer Bertelsen & G. Krefft, 1988
 Himantolophus crinitus Bertelsen & G. Krefft, 1988
 Himantolophus danae Regan & Trewavas, 1932
 Himantolophus groenlandicus Johan Reinhardt Robert Football, 1837 (Atlantic footballfish)
 Himantolophus litoceras A. L. Stewart & Pietsch, 2010 
 Himantolophus macroceras Bertelsen & G. Krefft, 1988
 Himantolophus macroceratoides Bertelsen & G. Krefft, 1988
 Himantolophus mauli Bertelsen & G. Krefft, 1988
 Himantolophus melanolophus Bertelsen & G. Krefft, 1988
 Himantolophus multifurcatus Bertelsen & G. Krefft, 1988
 Himantolophus nigricornis Bertelsen & G. Krefft, 1988
 Himantolophus paucifilosus Bertelsen & G. Krefft, 1988
 Himantolophus pseudalbinares Bertelsen & G. Krefft, 1988
 Himantolophus rostratus Regan, 1925
 Himantolophus sagamius S. Tanaka (I), 1918 (Pacific footballfish)
 Himantolophus stewarti Pietsch & Kenaley, 2011

Further reading

Gallery

References

Anderson, M. Eric and Leslie, Robin W. (2001). "Review of the deep-sea anglerfishes (Lophiiformes: Ceratioidei) of southern Africa". Ichthyological Bulletin. J.L.B. Smith Institute of Ichthyology, Rhodes University. . Retrieved October 31, 2005.
Munk, Ole. (1999). "The escal photophore of ceratioids (Pisces; Ceratioidei) — a review of structure and function". Acta Zoologica, Vol 80., Issue 4, pp. 265–284. Retrieved October 31, 2005.

https://www.jstor.org/stable/1443462

Himantolophidae
Deep sea fish
Marine fish genera
Ray-finned fish genera